The 2013 Guimarães Open was a professional tennis tournament played on hard courts. It was the first edition of the tournament which was part of the 2013 ATP Challenger Tour. It took place in Guimarães, Portugal between 22 and 28 July 2013.

Singles main-draw entrants

Seeds

 1 Rankings are as of July 15, 2013.

Other entrants
The following players received wildcards into the singles main draw:
  João Domingues
  Gonçalo Pereira
  Frederico Ferreira Silva
  Rui Pedro Silva

The following players received entry from the qualifying draw:
  Iván Arenas-Gualda
  Andrés Artuñedo
  Matteo Donati
  Jaime Pulgar-García

Champions

Singles

 João Sousa def.  Marius Copil 6–3, 6–0

Doubles

 James Cluskey /  Maximilian Neuchrist vs.  Roberto Ortega-Olmedo /  Ricardo Villacorta-Alonso 6–7(5–7), 6–2, [10–8]

External links
Official website

Guimaraes Open
Guimarães Open
2013 in Portuguese tennis